John McKane (died 11 January 1886) was a British politician. He was the Conservative Member of Parliament (MP) for the Irish constituency of Mid Armagh from the 1885 general election, when the constituency had been created, until his death early the following year.

References

External links 

Year of birth missing
1886 deaths
Irish Conservative Party MPs
Members of the Parliament of the United Kingdom for County Armagh constituencies (1801–1922)
UK MPs 1885–1886